Košarkaški klub Student Mostar is a professional basketball club from Mostar, Bosnia and Herzegovina that competes in the Basketball Championship of Bosnia and Herzegovina. They play their home games at Školska dvorana Bijeli Brijeg, the same venue that hosts rival team HKK Zrinjski Mostar.

The club had a lone season in the A2 Liga of Herceg-Bosne in 2011–12 before being promoted to the A1 Liga for the 2012–13 season. After finishing fifth in 2013–14 with a 12–6 win–loss record, Student Mostar went on to win the 2014–15 Herceg-Bosne championship and earned promotion to the Basketball Championship of Bosnia and Herzegovina.

Honours
Herzeg-Bosnia League
Winners (2): 2014–15, 2016–17

Notable players
 Mario Barbarić

References

External links
Team profile at eurobasket.com

Basketball teams in Bosnia and Herzegovina